Miroslav Přerost (born 1963) is a Czech former professional ice hockey forward who played with HC Plzen during the 1982–83 Czech Extraliga season. He is currently the head coach of the Czech Republic men's national junior ice hockey team. Having been head coach of HC Plzeň,  (Germany) and Lillehammer IK (Norway), he coached the Czech junior team at the 2012, 2013 and the 2014 World Junior Ice Hockey Championships.

References

1963 births
Living people
Czech ice hockey forwards
HC Plzeň players
Czechoslovak ice hockey forwards
Czechoslovak ice hockey coaches
Czech ice hockey coaches
Czech expatriate sportspeople in Norway
Czech expatriate sportspeople in Germany
Czech expatriate ice hockey people